Robat-e Aghaj (also Romanized as Robāţ-e Āghāj and Robat Aghaj) is a village in Hamzehlu Rural District, in the Central District of Khomeyn County, Markazi Province, Iran. At the 2006 census, its population was 120, in 36 families.

References 

Populated places in Khomeyn County